Mica Mountain is an  peak in the Rincon Mountain District of Saguaro National Park in Pima County, Arizona, about  east of Tucson. It is the highest point of the park and the highest point in the Rincon Mountains.

See also
 List of mountain peaks of Arizona

References

Mountains of Arizona
Landforms of Pima County, Arizona
North American 2000 m summits
Mountains of Pima County, Arizona
Highest points of United States national parks